Maira Begwal [Urdu: میرا بیگوال] is a village located on Simly Dam Road in Zone-IV, Islamabad Capital Territory, Pakistan and is administered by the Pind Begwal Union Council. Its geographical coordinates are 33.74 N,73.25 E and its original name (with diacritics) is Maira Begwal.[1]

A hillside village with picturesque landscapes, Maira Begwal is home to approximately 2000 residents with most of them employed in either agricultural farming or small family-owned businesses around the village. Also a large number are providing their services outside the country all over the world.

Farmhouses

Maira Begwal encompasses the following farmhouse schemes;

 Pakistan Naval Farms
 ANZA Zephyr Dale

Note: Generally the land ownership registration and transfer process is achieved through Registry (Intiqal) with Land Registrar (Tehsildar) Islamabad through a Village accountant (Patwari) for the respective Union Council.

Development
 A model Polytechnic Institute is being established by the Allama Iqbal Open University (AIOU) with the collaboration of the Capital Administration and Development Division. AIOU will introduce Diploma and Associate Diploma Courses in various disciplines and other skilled and job-oriented programmes.
 Under "E-Village Project of Pakistan", the Multi-purpose Computer Telecentre (MCT) was established in May 2009 as a Not-for-profit project. With the support of the Universal Service Fund, Maira Begwal became the first E-Village in Pakistan with Broadband Internet provided by Nayatel Islamabad enabling Internet access to the rural population of the entire area.

Events

 On 8 March 2014 on the occasion of International Women’s Day, the NUST Community Service Club (NCSC) team visited the E-village facilities in Maira Begwal for the Fundraiser in collaboration with TABA Youth Chapter and E-village coordinators. E-Village is a Non-governmental organization (NGO), working for Empowerment through ICT's in Pakistan.

See also
 Islamabad Union Councils
 Developments in Islamabad
 Union councils of Pakistan
 Pind Begwal
 Siwerah Village
 Jagiot Village
 Malot Village
 Bain Nala Village
 Darmiyana Mohallah

References

          9. https://www.facebook.com/groups/MairaBegwal/

External links
Capital Development Authority
Unauthorized Housing Schemes in Islamabad
E-Village Community Service Project
Allama Iqbal Open University
Capital Administration and Development Division

Union councils of Islamabad Capital Territory
Villages in Islamabad Capital Territory